Zhenfeng County is a county in the southwest of Guizhou province, China. It is under the administration of the Qianxinan Buyei and Miao Autonomous Prefecture.

Climate

References

County-level divisions of Guizhou
Qianxinan Buyei and Miao Autonomous Prefecture